Keylon Stokes (born October 18, 1999) is an American football wide receiver for the Tulsa Golden Hurricane.

Stokes was born in 1999 and attended Manvel High School in Manvel, Texas. As a senior, he totaled 1,263 receiving yards and 15 touchdowns. 

Stokes played six years of college football for Tulsa from 2017 to 2022. He led the team in receiving four times, tallying 575 yards in 2018, 1,040 yards in 2019, 644 yards in 2020, and 1,177 yards through the first eleven games of the 2022 season. He ranks fourth nationally in receiving yards through games played on November 19, 2022. In October 2022, he broke Howard Twilley's Tulsa record of 3,343 receiving yards set from 1963 to 1965.

References

External links
 Tulsa bio

1999 births
Living people
American football wide receivers
Tulsa Golden Hurricane football players
People from Brazoria County, Texas
Players of American football from Texas